The 3 arrondissements of the Haute-Loire department are:
 Arrondissement of Brioude, (subprefecture: Brioude) with 111 communes.  The population of the arrondissement was 45,768 in 2016.  
 Arrondissement of Le Puy-en-Velay, (prefecture of the Haute-Loire department: Le Puy-en-Velay) with 102 communes.  The population of the arrondissement was 96,498 in 2016.  
 Arrondissement of Yssingeaux, (subprefecture: Yssingeaux) with 44 communes.  The population of the arrondissement was 85,073 in 2016.

History

In 1800 the arrondissements of Le Puy, Brioude and Yssingeaux were established. The arrondissement of Yssingeaux was disbanded in 1926, and restored in 1942. In January 2007 the arrondissement of Brioude absorbed the canton of Saugues from the arrondissement of Le Puy-en-Velay.

References

Haute-Loire